Shawn Nichols Weatherly is an American actress and beauty queen who won the titles of Miss USA and Miss Universe in 1980. She went on to star as Cadet Karen Adams in the film Police Academy 3: Back in Training (1986), and as Jill Riley in the first season of the TV series Baywatch (1989–90).

Early life
The youngest of three children, Weatherly was born in San Antonio, Texas, to her mother Joanne, a former Christian Dior model; and her father, a member of the US Air Force stationed in San Antonio. When Weatherly was 9, her family moved to Sumter, South Carolina, where she spent the remainder of her childhood years. She is a 1977 graduate of Sumter High School.

Weatherly attended Clemson University as a nursing major. She was also a member of the Delta Delta Delta sorority.

Career

Beauty pageants
 
The Miss USA 1980 pageant was televised live from Biloxi, Mississippi. Weatherly won the preliminary competition by a clear margin, and went on to win all three rounds of the final competition (interview, evening gown, and swimsuit). She was the only woman to score above 9.0 in the preliminary rounds and in the swimsuit and evening gown competitions. Weatherly was the second contestant from South Carolina to win the title.

In July 1980, Weatherly competed in the Miss Universe pageant held in Seoul, South Korea, where again she won all rounds of competition. Her closest rivals were Miss Scotland Linda Gallagher, who was first runner-up, and Denyse Nottle of New Zealand (who placed second in the interview and swimsuit competitions), who was second runner-up.

Weatherly was the fifth Miss Universe from the United States. Miriam Stevenson, the only other Miss USA from South Carolina, had won the title in 1954, making South Carolina one of the most successful states in the national pageant circuit. At the end of her reign, she crowned Irene Saez of Venezuela as her successor. After Weatherly, no Miss USA became Miss Universe until Chelsi Smith in 1995.

Film and television
Weatherly is best known for her work as Jill Riley on the television show Baywatch and for the early reality show Oceanquest, which had her swimming with sharks. She played a small part on a Dukes of Hazzard episode, "Coy vs. Vance," and appeared in other shows such as The A-Team, T. J. Hooker and Happy Days. She also had a main role in the 1986 comedy film Police Academy 3: Back in Training. In 2014, she was in the horror comedy film, Love in the Time of Monsters.

Personal life
In 1994 she married Chip Harris, president of a biotech research company, and they have two children together. Previously she had relationships with Lee Majors and Dwight Clark.

Filmography

References

External links
 

American film actresses
American television actresses
Clemson University alumni
Living people
Miss Universe winners
Miss Universe 1980 contestants
Miss USA 1980 delegates
Miss USA winners
People from San Antonio
People from Sumter, South Carolina
21st-century American women
Year of birth missing (living people)